This is a list of universities in San Marino.
University of the Republic of San Marino is the only recognized university in the microstate.
The Akademio Internacia de la Sciencoj San Marino is registered in San Marino, but organizes education services in countries all over Europe.

Universities
San Marino
San Marino